Tantine Mushiya Ntumba, known as Tantine Mushiya, is a DR Congolese footballer who plays for the DR Congo women's national team.

Club career
Mushiya has played for OCL City in the Democratic Republic of the Congo.

International career
Mushiya capped for the DR Congo at senior level during the 2020 CAF Women's Olympic Qualifying Tournament (third round).

See also
 List of Democratic Republic of the Congo women's international footballers

References

Living people
Democratic Republic of the Congo women's footballers
Democratic Republic of the Congo women's international footballers
Year of birth missing (living people)
Women's association footballers not categorized by position